Inbal Pezaro (born 26 March 1987) is an Israeli Paralympic swimmer.

Biography
Pezaro was born on Kibbutz Yizre'el. At birth she suffered from a complex with blood vessels at her spinal cord, which caused her to become paralyzed in her lower limbs. At the age of five she began practicing sports at the ILAN center in Haifa, progressing to compete in national championships only six years later.

Swimming career
From the age of 12 Pezaro had been competing in international swimming competitions. Following her exemption from military service with the Israel Defense Forces (IDF), she volunteered to service and was certified as a swimming instructor.

She took part at the 2004 Summer Paralympics and the 2008 Summer Paralympics. Pezaro won a silver medal on the opening day of the 2008 Beijing Paralympics, after coming in second place in the 100-meter freestyle competition. She set a new Israeli record with 1:12.57 minutes. Pezaro claimed her second medal, finishing second in the 200 meters freestyle S5 competition. Bela Hlavackova of the Czech Republic beat Pezaro in the women's 100 breast SB4, giving Inbal her third silver medal of the Beijing Paralympics. Pezaro emerged as one of the country's biggest stars in the Paralympics in Beijing. She won a bronze medal in the 2016 Rio Paralympics 200 meter freestyle, coming in at 3:38.20 minutes.

Honors
In 2002, she was honored to light a torch at the national Independence Day celebrations. In 2007, she was awarded "Sportswoman of the Year" title by the Israeli Association for Disabled Sports.

References

External links
 

1987 births
Living people
Israeli female swimmers
S5-classified Paralympic swimmers
Paralympic swimmers of Israel
Paralympic silver medalists for Israel
Paralympic bronze medalists for Israel
Paralympic medalists in swimming
Swimmers at the 2004 Summer Paralympics
Swimmers at the 2008 Summer Paralympics
Swimmers at the 2012 Summer Paralympics
Medalists at the 2004 Summer Paralympics
Medalists at the 2008 Summer Paralympics
Medalists at the 2012 Summer Paralympics
Medalists at the 2016 Summer Paralympics
Medalists at the World Para Swimming Championships
Medalists at the World Para Swimming European Championships